The 1906 season was the seventh season overall for the Chicago White Sox, and their sixth season in the major leagues. The Sox won their second American League pennant and their first World Series championship.

The Sox won 93 games in the regular season–– a plateau they would not reach again until the 1915 season–– to claim the pennant, propelled by an historic 19-game winning streak in August. They won the league pennant largely on the strength of their pitching staff, as their team batting average of .230 was the worst in the AL. The White Sox would go on to upset their crosstown neighbors, the Chicago Cubs (who had finished 116–36 that year for the best winning percentage in modern baseball history), in the World Series, earning them the moniker of the "Hitless Wonders."

Regular season 

The 1906 White Sox team became known as the Hitless Wonders, having won the American League pennant despite posting the lowest team batting average (.230) in the league. The team had been in fourth place by the end of July, 7½ games behind the defending champion Philadelphia Athletics, when they went on a 19-game winning streak that drove them into first place. No American League team would beat the 19-game winning streak for almost 100 years. The team made up for their lack of hitting prowess by leading the league in walks, hit batsmen and sacrifice hits. The White Sox pitching staff had a league-leading 32 shutouts and the second lowest earned run average in the league. The White Sox then defeated their cross-town rivals, the heavily favored Chicago Cubs in the 1906 World Series.

Season standings

Record vs. opponents

Roster

Player stats

Batting

Starters by position 
Note: Pos = Position; G = Games played; AB = At bats; H = Hits; Avg. = Batting average; HR = Home runs; RBI = Runs batted in

Other batters 
Note: G = Games played; AB = At bats; H = Hits; Avg. = Batting average; HR = Home runs; RBI = Runs batted in

Pitching

Starting pitchers 
Note: G = Games pitched; IP = Innings pitched; W = Wins; L = Losses; ERA = Earned run average; SO = Strikeouts

Other pitchers 
Note: G = Games pitched; IP = Innings pitched; W = Wins; L = Losses; ERA = Earned run average; SO = Strikeouts

Relief pitchers 
Note: G = Games pitched; W = Wins; L = Losses; SV = Saves; ERA = Earned run average; SO = Strikeouts

1906 World Series 

AL Chicago White Sox (4) vs NL Chicago Cubs (2)

References 
1906 Chicago White Sox at Baseball Reference

Chicago White Sox seasons
Chicago White Sox season
American League champion seasons
World Series champion seasons
Chicago White Sox